Liberty Lake is a lake in Spokane County in the U.S. state of Washington. The lake is part of the Spokane Valley–Rathdrum Prairie Aquifer. Besides the aquifer, the only outflow is a small unnamed stream that ends at a small ephemeral pond a little over 1 mile (1.9 km) to the North.

Native fish species
Liberty lake has a fishing season that lasts from March 1 to October 31. Early fishing in the month of March yields good results for the elusive brown trout. As the water warms, other fish such as the largemouth and smallmouth bass, and yellow perch become more prevalent. Other fish dwelling in the lake include black crappie, bluegill, brown bullhead, channel catfish, rainbow trout, and walleye.

See also

Lake Saltese
Shelley Lake
Lake Coeur d'Alene

References

Lakes of Washington (state)
Lakes of Spokane County, Washington